Randy Randleman (born January 25, 1954) is an American politician who has served in the Oklahoma House of Representatives from the 15th district since 2018.

References

1954 births
Living people
Republican Party members of the Oklahoma House of Representatives
21st-century American politicians